Rika Zaraï (19 February 1938 – 23 December 2020) was a Franco-Israeli singer and writer.

Early life 
Rika Gozman (later Zarai) was born in Jerusalem. Her father came from Odessa (now Ukraine) in the Russian Empire, and her mother from Valozhyn (now Belarus), then in Poland.

She passed her baccalaureate at the age of 17 and enlisted directly in the Israel Defense Forces, a year before her compulsory service would have drafted her. She attended the Jerusalem Music Conservatory where she obtained a first prize in piano. During her 18 months of army service, she was appointed producer of the entertainment troupe of the IDF Central Command.

On November 9, 1969, she was the victim of a car accident. The singer sank into a coma for six days and remained immobilized in a cast for eight months. Despite a reserved medical prognosis, she recovered completely after three years. It was during her painful convalescence that Rika composed, as a snub to her suffering, the song Balapapa, with joyful lyrics and which would be a great success.

In addition to her musical career, Rika Zaraï distinguished herself in the promotion of herbal medicine from the 1980s. After having studied alternative medicine for eleven years, she published under her name in 1985 a book Ma médecine naturelle (English: My natural medicine), which has sold 2 million copies. Its positions in this field have met with strong opposition, particularly from French pharmacists.

On June 3, 2008, Rika Zaraï was hospitalized urgently following a stroke. She was placed in intensive care at the Pitié-Salpêtrière Hospital, suffering in particular from partial paralysis on the left side of the body.

Music career 

In the 1950s, the Israeli writer, Aharon Megged, wrote a musical for the IDF Central Command entertainment troupe about five soldiers falling in love with five country girls. In 1956, it was produced commercially by the Ohel theater starring Rika Zarai. The music was written by her husband Yochanan Zarai, with lyrics and melodies by Naomi Shemer.

In 1969, Zarai rose to fame with her songs Casatschok and Alors je chante, the French version of Vivo Cantando. She went on to have a successful career in Europe, where she popularized Israeli classic songs such as Hava Nagila, Yerushalayim shel zahav and Hallelujah.

After publishing other books in the 1990s and continuing to study health, she returned to singing in 2000 with the album Hava. She sang at the Queen in Paris in 2000, and the oriental version of Hava nagila was successful in nightclubs where she sang until 2004.

On February 3, 2020, twelve years after her stroke, she sang in public during the Night of the Depression party organized by Raphaël Mezrahi at the Folies Bergère in Paris.

Zarai sang in Hebrew, English, French, Italian, Spanish and German. She lived in Paris but visited Israel periodically.

Discography 

Chante Israël (1962)
Rika Zaraï (1964)
Un beau jour je partirai (1967)
Alors je chante (1969)
Moi le dimanche (1971)
Les Dessins animés (1973)
Chansons d'Israël (1973)
Ma poupée de France (1975)
Dad li di (1979)
Chante l'ami (1982)
L'Espoir (1983)
Sans rancune et sans regret (1985)
Story (1988)
Hava (2000)
Quand les hommes (2007)

Published works

 Ma médecine naturelle, Michel Lafon, 1985
 47 recettes de plantes, Mangina, 1986
 Soins et beauté par l'argile et les plantes, Mangina, 1987
 Mes secrets naturels pour guérir et réussir, J-C Lattès, 1988
 Ces émotions qui guérissent, Michel Lafon, 1995
 Le Code secret de votre personnalité, Michel Lafon, 1996
 L'espérance a toujours raison (mémoires), Michel Lafon, 2006

See also
Music of Israel
Culture of Israel

References

External links
 
 

1938 births
2020 deaths
English-language singers from Israel
French-language singers of Israel
German-language singers of Israel
20th-century Israeli women singers
Jewish Israeli singers
Jewish women singers
Israeli people of Polish-Jewish descent
Israeli people of Ukrainian-Jewish descent
Philips Records artists